Juan Camilo Angulo Villegas (born September 26, 1988) is a Colombian footballer who currently plays as a full back for Deportivo Cali in the Categoría Primera A league.

Career
Angulo started his career with Colombian Categoría Primera A side América de Cali after being promoted from their youth team in the 2007 league season. The Head coach of the club Diego Edison Umaña would give Angulo his first league appearance on 18 May 2008 against Boyacá Chicó where the team lost 3-2 away in the Estadio La Independencia stadium. As the season progressed Angulo would gradually start to establish himself within the team and was part of the squad that won the 2008 Finalizacion at the end of the season. The following season Angulo would play in his first international competition, in the 2009 Copa Libertadores where he made his début against Defensor Sporting on 10 February 2009 in a 1-0 away defeat. Throughout the tournament he would play in five games before the club were knocked-out in the group stages.

After having played in 46 games for América de Cali, Angulo would attract interests from foreign teams and he would transfer to Argentine Primera División club Tigre for the 2010-11 season. His time at the club was marred by controversy when he accused the Head coach of the club Ricardo Caruso Lombardi of asking for a bribe to select him in the team. Lombardi denied any truth to these accusations, however the club decided to relieve him of his duties along with not renewing Angulo's short term contract.

It was confirmed on 17 January 2011 that Angulo joined Chinese Super League club Shanghai Shenhua. He would go on to make his début for the club in a league game against Qingdao Jonoon F.C. on 1 April 2011 in a 3-3 draw. This was followed by his first goal for the club on 23 April 2011 against Henan Jianye F.C. in a 2-1 away victory. When the season ended Angulo returned to Colombia to join top tier side Cúcuta Deportivo and made his first appearance for them in a league game against Envigado F.C. on 28 July 2012 in a 2-1 victory. His first goal for the club was scored against Independiente Medellín in a league game on 28 October 2012 in a 1-1 draw. In the 2013 league season Angulo was loaned out to Brazilian club Esporte Clube Bahia, when he returned to Cúcuta Deportivo they were relegated to the second division. He would stay with them for the following season before he left to join Independiente Medellin and then later a return to his original club of América de Cali. After two years at América de Cali, he joined crosstown rivals Deportivo Cali for the second half of the 2018 season.

Honours
América de Cali
2008 Finalización

Notes

References

External links
Career statistics at América de Cali website

1985 births
Living people
Colombian footballers
Association football defenders
América de Cali footballers
Club Atlético Tigre footballers
Shanghai Shenhua F.C. players
Cúcuta Deportivo footballers
Esporte Clube Bahia players
Independiente Medellín footballers
Deportivo Cali footballers
Colombian expatriate footballers
Expatriate footballers in Argentina
Expatriate footballers in Brazil
Expatriate footballers in China
Expatriate footballers in Portugal
Colombian expatriate sportspeople in China
Colombian expatriate sportspeople in Portugal
Categoría Primera A players
Argentine Primera División players
Campeonato Brasileiro Série A players
Chinese Super League players
Sportspeople from Valle del Cauca Department